The Men's 800m T53 had its First Round held on September 14 at 17:40 and its Final on September 15 at 18:48.

Medalists

Results

References
Round 1 - Heat 1
Round 1 - Heat 2
Round 1 - Heat 3
Final

Athletics at the 2008 Summer Paralympics